Ficus erecta (syn. Ficus beecheyana), the Japanese fig, is a species of flowering plant in the family Moraceae. It is found in the eastern Himalayas, Assam, Bangladesh, Vietnam, southern China, Taiwan, Jeju Island of South Korea, the Ryukyu Islands, and Japan.

Uses
The fruit are eaten by local peoples. Its bark fibers can be used to make paper, and it is occasionally planted as an ornamental. It is highly resistant to Ceratocystis fimbriata, which causes Ceratocystis canker in the common fig Ficus carica, so its genome has been sequenced.

References

erecta
Flora of Bangladesh
Flora of East Himalaya
Flora of Assam
Flora of Vietnam
Flora of South-Central China
Flora of Southeast China
Flora of Taiwan
Flora of South Korea
Flora of the Ryukyu Islands
Flora of Japan
Plants described in 1786